Carole Juanita Keddy (June 20, 1937 – January 2016) was an educator and political figure in New Brunswick, Canada. She represented Saint John Champlain in the Legislative Assembly of New Brunswick from 1999 to 2003 as a Progressive Conservative member.

Born in Saint John, New Brunswick, Keddy was educated at the New Brunswick Teacher's College, the University of New Brunswick and the University of Maryland, College Park. She was a teacher, vice-principal and principal in New Brunswick, Ontario, Manitoba, the Northwest Territories, the Yukon and Germany and taught at Simon Fraser University. She also owned and operated a manufacturing company while in British Columbia. From 1962 to 1966, Keddy worked with the North Atlantic Treaty Organization. Following her career in provincial politics, Keddy ran unsuccessfully for a seat on the Saint John City Council in 1995, 2004 and 2008.

References 
 MLA Biographies, Government of New Brunswick (pdf)
 List of Women MLAs, New Brunswick Legislative Library (pdf)

1937 births
Living people
Politicians from Saint John, New Brunswick
Progressive Conservative Party of New Brunswick MLAs
Women MLAs in New Brunswick
21st-century Canadian politicians
21st-century Canadian women politicians